Pittsylvania may refer to 

Pittsylvania County, Virginia, USA
an early name for the proposed Vandalia (colony)

See also
Pittsburgh, Pennsylvania
Pottsylvania